The Sands-Willets Homestead is a historic house and museum located within the Incorporated Village of Flower Hill in Nassau County, New York.

It is operated as a historic house museum by the Cow Neck Peninsula Historical Society, is designated as a Village of Flower Hill Landmark and a New York State Landmark, and is listed on the National Register of Historic Places.

Description

Main House 
The Sands-Willets Homestead is a 20-room, shingled 2-story building with an enlarged porch and porte cochere. The west wing dates to about 1735. It was originally a four-bay, -story house with end chimneys over a full-sized basement. The main portion of the house is a Greek Revival–style dwelling built during the first half of the 19th century.

When he home was built, it was the centerpiece of a 240-acre (97 ha) farm. At the time, the property stretched from Manhasset Bay at its western edge to Hempstead Harbor at its eastern edge, which was convenient for shipping produce to New York City and points beyond.

The Cow Neck Peninsula Historical Society purchased the home from Eliza Willets in 1976, for the purpose of preserving and restoring it, and turning it into a museum, research, and educational center.

Barn and garden 
A contributing barn and a garden are also located on the property. The barn, which dates to the late 17th Century, was moved to the property in 1978.

2020s renovations and accessibility upgrades 
The Historical Society received a grant for capital improvements, in December 2020. A $125,525 grant from the Robert David Lion Gardiner Foundation enabled the Society to renovate building's porch, and make other improvements, which enabled individuals in wheelchairs, or pushing baby stollers, to share in tours. The renovations were be made in ways that preserve the original heritage value of the house.

In popular culture 
Scenes for the HBO series Boardwalk Empire were filmed in the Sands-Willets House.

See also 

 The George Washington Denton House - Another historic home in the Village of Flower Hill. This home is also listed on the National Register of Historic Places.
 The Thomas Dodge Homestead - Another historic house museum that the Cow Neck Peninsula Historical Society operates, located in neighboring Port Washington.

References

External links
Sands-Willets House (Cow Neck Peninsula Historical Society website)

Flower Hill, New York
Historic house museums in New York (state)
Houses on the National Register of Historic Places in New York (state)
Greek Revival houses in New York (state)
Houses completed in 1735
Houses in Nassau County, New York
Museums in Nassau County, New York
National Register of Historic Places in Nassau County, New York